I Can See the Sun is a second novel written by Nodar Dumbadze in 1962. In 1965 Georgian director Lana Gogoberidze made a film with same name based on this novel.

The story of novel set in the war years and it describes the difficult situation in the villages and the fear people felt for their loved ones who were fighting at the front. Sosoia is teenager who loves blind Khatia, which will be cured in the finale of the plot.

External links 
 I Can See the Sun in Goodreads.

References 

1962 novels
20th-century Georgian novels
Georgian-language works
Novels by Nodar Dumbadze
Novels adapted into films
Autobiographical novels